The 2015–16 George Washington Colonials women's basketball team will represent George Washington University during the 2015–16 college basketball season. The Colonials, led by fourth year head coach Jonathan Tsipis. The Colonials were members of the Atlantic 10 Conference and play their home games at the Charles E. Smith Center. They finished the season 26–7, 13–3 in A-10 play to share the A-10 regular season title with Duquesne and Saint Louis. They won the A-10 tournament by defeating Duquesne and received an automatic bid to the NCAA women's tournament where they lost to Kansas State in the first round.

On March 28, it was announced that Jonathan Tsipis resigned from George Washington to accept the head coaching job at Wisconsin. He finished with a 4-year record of 92–38.

2015–16 media

George Washington Colonials Sports Network
WRGW will carry the Colonials games and broadcast them online at GWRadio.com. The A-10 Digital Network will carry all non-televised Colonials home games and most conference road games through RaiseHigh Live.

Roster

Schedule

|-
!colspan=9 style="background:#00285C; color:#EECFA1;"| Exhibition

|-
!colspan=9 style="background:#00285C; color:#EECFA1;"| Non-conference regular season

|-
!colspan=9 style="background:#00285C; color:#EECFA1;"| Atlantic 10 regular season

|-
!colspan=9 style="background:#00285C; color:#EECFA1;"| Atlantic 10 Women's Tournament

|-
!colspan=9 style="background:#00285C; color:#EECFA1;"| NCAA Women's Tournament

Rankings

See also
 2015–16 George Washington Colonials men's basketball team

References

George Washington
George Washington Colonials women's basketball seasons
George Washington